The Elementary Particles may refer to:

 Elementary particle, concept in particle physics
 Atomised, novel by Michel Houellebecq
 Atomised (film), German film based on the novel
 The Elementary Particles (2021 film), French television film based on the novel